Ian Lloyd may refer to:

Ian Lloyd (rugby league), English rugby league footballer of the 1930s
Sir Ian Lloyd (politician) (1921–2006), British Conservative politician
Ian Lloyd (cricketer) (1938–2009), South African cricketer
Ian Lloyd (musician) (born 1947), American singer
Ian Lloyd (photographer) (born 1953), Australian photographer